China Gate may refer to:
 China Gate (1957 film), a Hollywood film directed by Samuel Fuller and starring Gene Barry and Angie Dickinson 
 China Gate (1998 film), a Hindi film directed by Rajkumar Santoshi 
 China Gate (website), a Chinese online website
 China Gate (album), a 1996 album by Cul de Sac
 China Gates, a 1977 piano piece by John Adams

See also
 1996 United States campaign finance controversy, known as "Chinagate"
 Gate of China (disambiguation)